Bjørn Viljugrein (born 24 November 1969) is a retired Norwegian football midfielder. He represented the Norway national team on one occasion in 1997.

He started his career in Strømmen IF and was drafted into the senior team in 1988. In 1992 he moved on to the larger club Vålerenga, only lasting one year and moving on to Lørenskog IF.

However, in 1995 he finally made his break onto the first tier when joining newly promoted Stabæk. From 1997 to 2001 he enjoyed a steady second spell with Vålerenga, though missing the 1999 season through a serious knee injury. He won the 1997 Norwegian Football Cup Final. In 2002 he rounded off with a season in Hønefoss BK.

References

1969 births
Living people
People from Skedsmo
Norwegian footballers
Strømmen IF players
Vålerenga Fotball players
Stabæk Fotball players
Hønefoss BK players
Norwegian First Division players
Eliteserien players
Association football midfielders
Norway international footballers
Sportspeople from Viken (county)